The Joy of Living is a 1961 Italian-French comedy film directed by René Clément. It was entered into the 1961 Cannes Film Festival.

Plot
The story is set in Rome, in the year 1921. Ulisse (Alain Delon) enrolls in the Italian Fascist party because he cannot find any employment. The first task entrusted to him by the party leads Ulysses to the printer Fossati, where he's hired as an apprentice. This brings him into contact with a family of anarchists, who will turn him into a reluctant hero for love of the beautiful Franca (Barbara Lass). However, at a time when he must make a decisive choice, Ulysses obeys neither the anarchists nor the fascists, and risks his life for a different idea of freedom.

Cast
 Alain Delon as Ulisse Cecconato
 Barbara Lass as Franca Fossati
 Gino Cervi as Olinto Fossati
 Rina Morelli as Rosa Fossati
 Carlo Pisacane as Grandfather "Fossati"
 Paolo Stoppa as Hairdresser
 Giampiero Littera as Turiddu
 Didi Perego as Isabella
 Nanda Primavera
 Ugo Tognazzi as Anarchist
 Aroldo Tieri
 Leopoldo Trieste
 Gastone Moschin

References

External links

1961 films
Commedia all'italiana
1960s Italian-language films
1961 comedy films
French black-and-white films
Films directed by René Clément
Films set in Rome
Films set in the 1920s
Films with screenplays by Pierre Bost
1960s French films
1960s Italian films
Italian-language French films